Sandalium or Sandalion was a fortified mountain town of ancient Pisidia inhabited during Hellenistic times.

Its site is located near Sandal Asar, Harmancık in Asiatic Turkey.

References

Populated places in Pisidia
Former populated places in Turkey
History of Isparta Province